Nicholas Fredrick Riewoldt (born 17 October 1982) is a former Australian rules footballer who played for the St Kilda Football Club in the Australian Football League (AFL). He was the first draft selection in the 2000 AFL draft. He was the captain of St Kilda in 2005 and from 2007 to 2016. Riewoldt holds the all-time record for most marks in VFL/AFL history, surpassing Gary Dempsey in late 2017. Ever since this moment he has been referred to as Gary RooVempsta.

Early life
Born in Hobart, Tasmania to father Joerg ("Joe") (former Clarence Football Club player) and mother Fiona, Riewoldt and his family moved to the Gold Coast, Queensland, when he was 9 years old. He attended Robina State Primary School from Grade 5 and became the school's vice captain and UNICEF representative. He later switched to All Saints Anglican School during his high school years. Australian rules football was not offered in many Queensland schools at the time but he made a name for himself as an overall sportsman, participating in the school's athletics, cross country, cricket, soccer and touch football teams at a high level. Academically, he also excelled in the studies of physics and chemistry.

Riewoldt played his junior and early senior football at the Broadbeach Cats before moving to the Southport Sharks where he was identified as an outstanding junior talent. He played a big part in Southport's historic fourth consecutive QAFL premiership in 2000. After being kept virtually touchless for the first half, he was moved into the ruck and kicked two important goals in the 11-point grand final victory.

Growing up, Riewoldt supported the Hawthorn Football Club. He is the first cousin of  footballer Jack Riewoldt, who also plays as a forward.

AFL career
Riewoldt was the No. 1 Draft Pick in the 2000 AFL Draft and made his debut in 2001. He won the AFL Rising Star Award in 2002, earning his nomination in round 5 for his efforts in a drawn match against .

2004 season
His breakout season was 2004 when he took an AFL record 256 marks and also finished in the top ten for both the Coleman and Brownlow medals.  He received the AFL Players Association Most Valuable Player Award, the Leigh Matthews Trophy and was selected in the 2004 All-Australian Team for the first time.

2005 season 
Riewoldt was rewarded for his 2004 efforts when St Kilda named him club captain for 2005 as part of their rotating captaincy policy. His 2005 season began badly as he broke his collarbone in the third quarter of the first game of the season against the Brisbane Lions. This drew controversy as he was then bumped after the injury by Lions players Chris Scott and Mal Michael. The pair were not asked to face the AFL tribunal on charges of misconduct for targeting an injured player as it was ruled that they would not have known that Riewoldt was injured, that Riewoldt had waved away a trainer that was attending to the injury and that the bumps did not contribute to the injury.

2006 season
Early in the 2006 season, Riewoldt returned close to his best form, kicking five goals against former powerhouse Brisbane in Round 3. This match seemed to have put Riewoldt's kicking "yips" to bed, but they returned during the Round 7 match against Geelong when he missed a simple but critical goal from 15 metres out. This miss was forgotten the next week when Riewoldt kicked 9 goals against Carlton and took many contested marks. Riewoldt also took a match saving mark for the Saints against Sydney in Round 11, a match the Saints won in wet conditions, and one that kept their finals hopes alive.

Riewoldt topped off the 2006 season by winning his third Trevor Barker Award. In achieving this feat, Riewoldt has already emulated some of the Saints greatest players such as the 1966 premiership captain Darrel Baldock, former skipper Nathan Burke and past champions Wells Eicke, Jack Davis and Jim Ross. Riewoldt was recognised for his season with selection in the 2006 All-Australian Team as a forward player, his second career All-Australian Team award.

2007 season

At the beginning of the 2007 season, Lyon appointed Riewoldt Co-Captain of the St Kilda Football Club, along with Luke Ball and Lenny Hayes, both former captains themselves. Back and hamstring injuries forced Riewoldt to miss the first three matches of the season. Riewoldt started the season well, with eight goals in his first two matches. In Round 7, Riewoldt dominated against the Sydney Swans, which kick started another outstanding year. Despite the Saints missing the finals, Riewoldt enjoyed a better year statistically than 2004, narrowly winning St Kilda's best and fairest Trevor Barker Award ahead of defender Sam Fisher.

2008 season
At the beginning of the season, Riewoldt assumed the sole captaincy of the club.

Riewoldt played in St Kilda's 2008 NAB Cup winning side – the club's third pre-season cup win. Riewoldt had a consistent 2008 season, coming second in the AFL for marks (behind Matthew Richardson) and kicking 57 home and away season goals (63 all up) to finish ninth in the competition. This performance earned him his third All-Australian selection, his first at centre-half-forward. He was also selected to play in the Hall of Fame Tribute Match, but was ultimately unable to play due to a knee injury.

2009 season
Early in the season Riewoldt became a target for the fledgling Gold Coast Football Club, which was awarded the 17th licence to enter the AFL in 2011. However, he knocked back their offer to remain at St Kilda.

Riewoldt took the most marks of any player in the league, averaging 9.7 a game and kicking 65 goals in the home and away season, averaging 3.3 a game.

He was a significant player in a St Kilda team that went through the home and away season with 20 wins and 2 defeats.

Riewoldt played in 21 of 22 matches in the 2009 home-and-away rounds in which St Kilda qualified in first position for the finals series, winning the club's third minor premiership.

Riewoldt was recognised for his season with selection in the 2009 All-Australian Team as a forward player. He was also named captain of the 2009 All-Australian Team, his fourth All-Australian Team award.

In the preliminary final against the Western Bulldogs, Riewoldt kicked four goals, one of which was in the final minutes..

St Kilda qualified for the 2009 AFL Grand Final after qualification and preliminary finals wins but were defeated by Geelong by 12 points. Riewoldt kicked one goal.

Riewoldt won the 2009 Trevor Barker Award for St Kilda's best and fairest player, setting a new club record of five career best and fairest awards.  He was also St Kilda's leading goal kicker in 2009.

2010 season
During St Kilda's 28-point Round 3 win over Collingwood, on 9 April 2010, Riewoldt experienced a high-grade hamstring tear. He underwent surgery and made his return in Round 15, playing 15 games in the season for 39 goals.

Riewoldt would play in the drawn 2010 AFL Grand Final and its subsequent replay, also against Collingwood.

In the first game, Riewoldt kicked two goals and was among St Kilda's best players. After the game, the two captains, Riewoldt and Nick Maxwell of Collingwood, both stated that they would have preferred an extra time period. Ultimately, this would be the last grand final to be replayed, as a provision for extra time in the case of a draw was introduced in 2016.

In the second game, however, Riewoldt was infamously chased down and tackled to prevent an otherwise certain goal from point-blank range by Collingwood's Heath Shaw. St Kilda ultimately lost the replay by 56 points.

2016 season
On 1 September 2016, at the Saints' best-and-fairest awards night, Riewoldt announced that he would stand down as St Kilda captain.

2017 season
On 31 July 2017, Riewoldt announced that he would retire at the end of the season. He played the final game of his career in Round 23 when he had 15 disposals, 8 marks and 1 goal in a loss to the Richmond Tigers, his cousin's team. In Round 17, it was thought Riewoldt had beaten Gary Dempsey's supposed tally of 2,906 marks, but research not long after by veteran statistician Col Hutchinson revealed that there were possession stats missing from a game from Dempsey's career, with only his goal in that game being counted towards his stats. Nevertheless, Riewoldt broke the record beyond all reasonable doubt before the end of his final season, taking 38 more marks than Dempsey's recorded tally. For reference, Brian Lake holds the post-1999 record for most marks in a game, with 24.

Photo controversy
On 20 December 2010, a photo with a nude image of Riewoldt was posted on the social networking site Facebook by a 17-year-old girl. The girl, whose name was initially withheld in the media due to her age, stated that her actions were a result of unfair treatment at the hands of the AFL regarding an incident earlier in the year, in which she claimed she had become pregnant as a result of having sex with two St Kilda players following a school football clinic. Another nude photo, of fellow Saints player Nick Dal Santo, was also posted. In a subsequent press conference Riewoldt claimed to have never met the girl and that the photo had been taken over a year prior, during an end-of-season trip, in Miami, Florida, by teammate Sam Gilbert, and that he had asked Gilbert to immediately delete the photo. Gilbert stated that the photos had been stolen from his own personal computer, describing the incident as a "significant breach of privacy without my knowledge or consent". The girl disputed Gilbert's statement, saying that she had taken the photos and was in possession of at least 19 more images of other AFL players. The girl later admitted this to be a lie, stating that she fabricated this claim of ownership so as not to get into any trouble. She then claimed to have been sent the photos by an unnamed St Kilda player in April of that year. On 24 December 2010, a Federal Court granted a permanent injunction on the images, supporting Riewoldt and Gilbert's statement that the photos had been stolen from Gilbert's laptop computer without consent. Justice Shane Marshall ordered the images and any others be deleted from the girl's computer, with mediation between her and the St Kilda Football Club scheduled to take place on 28 January 2011.

Personal life
Riewoldt is married to Catherine Heard. The pair married in October 2012 at her parent's property in Waco, Texas, United States. They have three sons, born in 2014, 2016 and 2019. His sister Madeleine died of aplastic anaemia, a rare bone marrow condition, in February 2015 at the age of 26. Riewoldt and his family established Maddie Riewoldt's Vision to raise funds for research into new treatments for blood cancers. Once a year during the AFL season, when the St Kilda Saints (Nick Riewoldt's team) and the Richmond Tigers (his cousin Jack Riewoldt's) are scheduled to play against each other, it has become known as "Maddie's Match" and acts as a fundraiser to find new and improved treatments for aplastic anaemia.

He was the winner of the second season of Celebrity MasterChef Australia.

Statistics

Riewoldt's player profile at AFL Tables:

*10 games required to be eligible.

|- style="background-color: #EAEAEA"
! scope="row" style="text-align:center" | 2001
|style="text-align:center;"|
| 12 || 6 || 2 || 2 || 43 || 14 || 57 || 26 || 3 || 0.3 || 0.3 || 7.2 || 2.3 || 9.5 || 4.3 || 0.5
|-
! scope="row" style="text-align:center" | 2002
|style="text-align:center;"|
| 12 || 22 || 21 || 18 || 225 || 94 || 319 || bgcolor="CFECEC"| 178 || 30 || 1.0 || 0.8 || 10.2 || 4.3 || 14.5 || bgcolor="b7e718"| 8.1 || 1.4
|- style="background-color: #EAEAEA"
! scope="row" style="text-align:center" | 2003
|style="text-align:center;"|
| 12 || 22 || 30 || 17 || 241 || 110 || 351 || 170 || 29 || 1.4 || 0.8 || 11.0 || 5.0 || 16.0 || 7.7 || 1.3
|-
! scope="row" style="text-align:center" | 2004
|style="text-align:center;"|
| 12 || 25 || 67 || 32 || 324 || 108 || 432 || bgcolor="DD6E81"| 256 || 25 || 2.7 || 1.3 || 13.0 || 4.3 || 17.3 || bgcolor="DD6E81"| 10.2 || 1.0
|- style="background-color: #EAEAEA"
! scope="row" style="text-align:center" | 2005
|style="text-align:center;"|
| 12 || 16 || 33 || 36 || 182 || 50 || 232 || 131 || 18 || 2.1 || bgcolor="b7e718"| 2.3 || 11.4 || 3.1 || 14.5 || 8.2 || 1.1
|-
! scope="row" style="text-align:center" | 2006
|style="text-align:center;"|
| 12 || 23 || 60 || 35 || 299 || 86 || 385 || bgcolor="DD6E81"| 214 || 23 || 2.6 || 1.5 || 13.0 || 3.7 || 16.7 || bgcolor="DD6E81"| 9.3 || 1.0
|- style="background-color: #EAEAEA"
! scope="row" style="text-align:center" | 2007
|style="text-align:center;"|
| 12 || 20 || 42 || 25 || 68 || 194 || 361 || 194 || 20 || 2.1 || 1.3 || 14.7 || 3.4 || 18.1 || bgcolor="DD6E81"| 9.7 || 1.0
|-
! scope="row" style="text-align:center" | 2008
|style="text-align:center;"|
| 12 || 24 || 65 || 39 || 288 || 122 || 410 || bgcolor="b7e718"| 240 || 18 || 2.7 || 1.6 || 12.0 || 5.1 || 17.1 || 10.0 || 0.8
|- style="background-color: #EAEAEA"
! scope="row" style="text-align:center" | 2009
|style="text-align:center;"|
| 12 || 24 ||78 || 47 || 318 || 95 || 413 || bgcolor="DD6E81"| 231 || 51 || 3.3 || 2.0 || 13.3 || 4.0 || 17.2 || bgcolor="DD6E81"| 9.6 || 2.1
|-
! scope="row" style="text-align:center" | 2010
|style="text-align:center;"|
| 12 || 15 || 39 || 34 || 174 || 83 || 257 || 120 || 26 || 2.6 || 2.3 || 11.6 || 5.5 || 17.1 || 8.0 || 1.7
|- style="background-color: #EAEAEA"
! scope="row" style="text-align:center" | 2011
|style="text-align:center;"|
| 12 || 22 || 36 || 31 || 221 || 133 || 354 || 154 || 50 || 1.6 || 1.4 || 10.0 || 6.0 || 16.1 || 7.0 || 2.3
|-
! scope="row" style="text-align:center" | 2012
|style="text-align:center;"|
| 12 || 19 || 47 || 31 || 200 || 76 || 276 || 125 || 47 || 2.5 || 1.6 || 10.5 || 4.0 || 14.5 || 6.6 || 2.5
|- style="background-color: #EAEAEA"
! scope="row" style="text-align:center" | 2013
|style="text-align:center;"|
| 12 || 21 || 50 || 36 || 281 || 109 || 390 || bgcolor="DD6E81"| 202 || 41 || 2.4 || 1.7 || 13.4 || 5.2 || 18.6 || bgcolor="DD6E81"| 9.6 || 2.0
|-
! scope="row" style="text-align:center" | 2014
|style="text-align:center;"|
| 12 || 22 || 49 || 21 || 262 || 105 || 367 || bgcolor="DD6E81"| 191 || 31 || 2.2 || 1.0 || 11.9 || 4.8 || 16.7 || bgcolor="DD6E81"| 8.7 || 1.4
|- style="background-color: #EAEAEA"
! scope="row" style="text-align:center" | 2015
|style="text-align:center;"|
| 12 || 17 || 29 || 15 || 214 || 73 || 287 || 165 || 28 || 1.7 || 0.9 || 12.6 || 4.3 || 16.9 || 9.7 || 1.6
|-
! scope="row" style="text-align:center" | 2016
|style="text-align:center;"|
| 12 || 21 || 41 || 24 || 300 || 136 || 436 || 222 || 40 || 2.0 || 1.1 || 14.3 || 6.5 || 20.8 || 10.6 || 1.9
|- style="background-color: #EAEAEA"
! scope="row" style="text-align:center" | 2017
|style="text-align:center;"|
| 12 || 17 || 29 || 12 || 186 || 100 || 286 || 125 || 38 || 1.7 || 0.7 || 10.9 || 5.9 || 16.8 || 7.4 || 2.2
|- class="sortbottom"
! colspan=3| Career
! 336
! 718
! 455
! 4051
! 1562
! 5613
! 2944
! 518
! 2.1
! 1.4
! 12.1
! 4.6
! 16.7
! 8.8
! 1.5
|}

Honours and achievements

Team
Pre-Season Cup (St Kilda): 2004, 2008

Individual
Trevor Barker Award: 2002, 2004, 2006, 2007, 2009, 2014
Leigh Matthews Trophy (AFLPA MVP Award): 2004
All-Australian: 2004, 2006, 2008, 2009 (C), 2014 (VC)
All-Australian: Captain 2009 ; Vice-Captain 2014)
Australian Football Media Association Player of the Year: 2004
Australian Representative Honours in International Rules Football: 2004, 2014, 2015
AFL Rising Star Award: 2002
AFL Rising Star Nominee: 2002 (Round 5)
St Kilda F.C. Leading Club Goalkicker Award: 2008, 2009, 2013, 2014
St Kilda F.C. Captain: 2005, 2007–2016
Most marks in a season: Six timesMost goals kicked and most games played at Docklands Stadium'''

References

External links

Trevor Barker Award winners
1982 births
All-Australians (AFL)
Leigh Matthews Trophy winners
Living people
St Kilda Football Club players
Southport Australian Football Club players
AFL Rising Star winners
Australian rules footballers from Queensland
Sportspeople from the Gold Coast, Queensland
Australian rules footballers from Hobart
Australia international rules football team players
Participants in Australian reality television series
Reality cooking competition winners
Australian people of German descent